The 1960 Pittsburgh Panthers football team represented the University of Pittsburgh in the 1960 NCAA University Division football season.

Schedule

Roster

Game summaries

at Syracuse

Team players drafted into the NFL

References

Pittsburgh
Pittsburgh Panthers football seasons
Pittsburgh Panthers football